Baphala eremiella is a species of snout moth in the genus Baphala. It was described by Harrison Gray Dyar Jr. in 1910, and is found in the US state of California.

The larvae feed on scale insects.

Taxonomy
The species was formerly listed as a synonym of Baphala pallida.

References

Moths described in 1910
Phycitinae